Ratzinger is a German surname. Notable people with the surname include:

Pope Benedict XVI, born Joseph Aloisius Ratzinger
Georg Ratzinger, a Catholic priest, musician, conductor, and brother of Pope Benedict XVI
Georg Ratzinger (politician), a Catholic priest, author, politician, and great-uncle of Georg Ratzinger and Pope Benedict XVI
Joseph Ratzinger, Sr., the father of Georg Ratzinger and Pope Benedict XVI
Wumpscut, born Rudolf 'Rudy' Ratzinger

See also
Ratzinger Foundation
Ratzinger Report
8661 Ratzinger, a main-belt asteroid

German-language surnames